A Trip Down Market Street is a 1906 phantom ride film of a cable car as it travels down Market Street in San Francisco. It is notable for capturing the city four days before the 1906 San Francisco earthquake. The film shows details of daily life in a major early 20th-century American city, including the transportation, fashions and architecture of the era. The film begins at 8th Street and continues eastward to the cable car turntable, at the Embarcadero, in front of the Ferry Building.

On April 17, two of the four Miles Brothers—Harry and Joseph—boarded a train for New York, taking the two films with them, but they heard about the earthquake and sent the films to New York while they boarded another train headed back to San Francisco. The Turk Street house of Earl Miles survived the earthquake and the subsequent catastrophic fire but the studio did not. The Miles brothers based their business out of Earl's home, and shot more film of post-earthquake scenes; some of this footage, including that of a second trip down a now devastated Market Street, reemerged in 2016.

In 2010, the film was selected for preservation in the National Film Registry by the Library of Congress.

Background

Filming date 

The film was originally thought to have been made in September or October 1905, based on the angles of shadows showing the sun's position. Film historian David Kiehn noticed that there were puddles of water seen in the street, and after he examined contemporary newspapers and weather reports, he realized that the early estimates were wrong: no rain had fallen in those months. Kiehn located the February 1906 registration record for a car license plate recorded in the film, and he found that the sun's angle would be the same in March as it had been in September.

In 2009, Kiehn suggested that A Trip Down Market Street was filmed in late March or early April 1906, a period with many rainy days reported. He found an advertisement for the film published in the New York Clipper on April 28, 1906, which stated that the film had been shot "just one week before the complete destruction of every building shown in the picture," though this was a somewhat hyperbolic claim given that a number of buildings seen in the film were heavily damaged and later repaired. If the "one week" statement was correct then the film would have been shot on April 11. Kiehn also found a San Francisco newspaper article published on March 29, 1906, describing the Miles Brothers' intent to film aboard a cable car.

In 2011, Richard Greene, an engineer with Bio-Rad Laboratories, published research dating the film to March 24–30, 1906, based on the sun throwing well-defined shadows on the Ferry Building. Greene confirmed that the film was shot at about 3:17 p.m., based on the Ferry Building clock. He also notes that his date range is about three weeks prior to the earthquake, inconsistent with the "one week" claim in the New York Clipper advertisement.

Traffic 
The film records a total of 30 cable cars, four horsecars, and four streetcars. At first there also appear to be many automobiles; however, a careful tracking shows that almost all of the autos circle the camera many times—one of them 10 times. This traffic was apparently staged by the producer to give Market Street the appearance of a prosperous modern boulevard with many automobiles. In 1906, the automobile was still something of a novelty in San Francisco, with horse-drawn buggies, carts, vans, and wagons being the common private and business vehicles. The near total lack of traffic control along Market Street emphasizes the newness of the automobile.

References

External links 

 
 4K scan from best known material, at Internet Archive
  (upscaled and colorized)

1900s short documentary films
1906 films
American black-and-white films
American short documentary films
American silent short films
Articles containing video clips
Documentary films about San Francisco
Market Street (San Francisco)
One-shot films
United States National Film Registry films
1900s American films